Vindoline is a chemical precursor to vinblastine.
Vindoline is formed through biosynthesis from Tabersonine.

See also
 Lochnericine

References

Tryptamine alkaloids
Indolizidines